Naval Base Puerto Princesa, Naval Base Palawan, was a United States Navy base built during World War II at Puerto Princesa on Palawan Island, Philippines, after the Invasion of Palawan on February 28, 1945. Puerto Princesa Bay offered an excellent base for fleet anchorage. At the naval base, US Navy Seabees built: a seaplane base, carrier aircraft fighter plane repair depot, land airfield and other base facilities.

History
Palawan Island is an eastern island of the Philippines and is the fifth largest of the Philippine islands. The island is 265 miles long and about 25 miles wide. The 84th Seabee Construction Battalion arrived at Puerto Princesa on March 12, 1945. Most of the captured Japanese facilities had been destroyed in bombing raids. One captured runway was easily repaired and was selected for repair and lengthening. The 84th Seabee Construction Battalion unloaded and loaned the needed equipment to the United States Army Engineers to work on the runway. The 84th Seabee Construction Battalion built all the other support facilities at the airfield. At the same time, the 84th Seabee Construction Battalion built all the needed port facilities. A large repair dept called a Carrier Aircraft Service Unit was built to service the planes on carrier aircraft. Naval Base Puerto Princesa was support by the very large Leyte-Samar Naval Base, east of Puerto Princesa. After the war, the base was closed and abandoned.

Bases and facilities
Fuel jetty to unload gasoline
Aviation gasoline Tank farm
Airfield camp, 2,500 troops
Seabee Camp
Seabee depot
Radar station
Fleet Post Office FPO# 3291 SF 
Naval hospital - small
Supply Depot
Repair Depot
Coral quarry
Repair base camp, barracks and mess hall
Three Carrier Aircraft Service Units
Power plant
Machine shops
Ammunition depot
Water plant for camp and to supply ships in the port. 
Fresh water tank farm, 126,000-gallons
USS Pollux (AKS-4)  general stores issue ship

Airfields
Puerto Princesa Airfield now Puerto Princesa International Airport

Puerto Princesa Seaplane Base
Puerto Princesa Seaplane Base opened May 15, 1945. Seaplane ramps and a land base was built. A 500-man camp to support the base was built. The USS Pocomoke (AV-9), a seaplane tender serviced the planes of the US Navy Patrol Squadron, VP-17.

Seabee units
Seabee units at Naval Base Puerto Princesa:
84th Seabee Construction Battalion 
Acorn 47
Acorn 52

Palawan massacre

Puerto Princesa is the site of the Palawan massacre. On December 14, 1944 Prisoner of war held by the Empire of Japan were killed to prevent the rescue of prisoners.

See also

U.S. Naval Base Subic Bay
Espiritu Santo Naval Base
US Naval Advance Bases
Naval Advance Base Saipan
Service Squadron

External Links
youtube WWII : Palawan Massacre
youtube "They Came To An Island" U.S. Navy Civil Engineer Corps Wwii Seabees Construction Battalions 29564

References

Airfields of the United States Navy
Military installations closed in the 1940s
Seaplane bases
Military installations of the United States in the Philippines
Closed installations of the United States Navy